The 1987 Junior Women's Softball World Championship is an international softball competition held in Normal, Illinois, United States from June 24–July 1, 1995. It was the fifth edition of the tournament.

Final standings

References

1995 in women's softball 
Junior Women's Softball
McLean County, Illinois
Softball in the United States
1995 in American women's sports
Women's sports in Illinois